Sripathi Rajeshwar Rao (died 28 April 2013) was an Indian politician. He was the founder of the fan association of actor N. T. Rama Rao. Rao served as a minister in the Andhra Pradesh state government for two terms and worked as the chairman of HUDA (Hyderabad Urban Development Authority), Setwin, and other corporations. He was the Andhra Pradesh MLA for the Musheerabad Constituency and MLA for the Sanathnagar Constituency. He was the founder and President of Akhila Bharatha 'NTR' Abhimana Sangham. He was called "Ajatha Shatruvu," meaning "a person with no enemy", as he was liked by leaders from all political parties.

Death
On 28 April 2013, Indian news media reported that Rao had died from kidney failure after a long illness, at the age of 73.

References

Members of the Andhra Pradesh Legislative Assembly
Deaths from kidney failure
Year of birth missing
2013 deaths
Telugu Desam Party politicians